The Higher Command is a 1935 German historical film directed by Gerhard Lamprecht and starring Lil Dagover, Karl Ludwig Diehl and Heli Finkenzeller. Produced and distributed by UFA, it was shot at the company's Babelsberg Studios in Potsdam. The film's sets were designed by the art directors Otto Erdmann and Hans Sohnle.

It was produced around the time of the Anglo-German Naval Agreement when the German government were still optimistic about forming an alliance with the British and saw the film as a way of recalling the historic Anglo-Prussian partnership in liberating Europe from Napoleon. The film was praised by the Minister of Propaganda Joseph Goebbels as "a national and engrossing film".

Synopsis
During the Napoleonic Wars, a Prussian army officer assists a British diplomat to construct an alliance to defeat Napoleon's France.

Cast

References

Bibliography

External links 
 

1935 films
Films of Nazi Germany
German historical films
German black-and-white films
1930s historical films
1930s German-language films
Films directed by Gerhard Lamprecht
Films set in England
Films set in London
Films set in Vienna
Napoleonic Wars films
UFA GmbH films
1930s German films
Films shot at Babelsberg Studios